Xu Tianlongzi (born January 11, 1991) is a Chinese swimmer. A native of Yantai, Shandong, she competed for Team China at the 2008 Summer Olympics.

Major achievements
2004 National Championships - 3rd 50 m back;
2005 Games of the Commonwealth of Independent States - 1st 50 m/100 m/200 m back;
2006 National Champions Tournament - 2nd 200 m back/4 × 100 m medley relay;
2006 World Military Swimming Championships - 1st 100 m back;
2006 Asian Games - 2nd 100 m back;
2007 World Championships - 3rd 4 × 100 m medley relay;
2007 World Military Games - 1st 200 m back;
2007 National Champions Tournament @ Olympic Qualification - 2nd 100 m/200 m back;
2008 National Champions Tournament & Olympic Selective Trials - 2nd 100 m back

References
 http://2008teamchina.olympic.cn/index.php/personview/personsen/794

1991 births
Living people
Chinese female backstroke swimmers
Swimmers from Shandong
Olympic bronze medalists for China
Olympic swimmers of China
Sportspeople from Yantai
Swimmers at the 2008 Summer Olympics
Olympic bronze medalists in swimming
World Aquatics Championships medalists in swimming
Asian Games medalists in swimming
Swimmers at the 2006 Asian Games
Swimmers at the 2010 Asian Games
Medalists at the 2008 Summer Olympics
Universiade medalists in swimming
Asian Games silver medalists for China
Asian Games bronze medalists for China
Medalists at the 2006 Asian Games
Medalists at the 2010 Asian Games
Universiade silver medalists for China
Medalists at the 2009 Summer Universiade
20th-century Chinese women
21st-century Chinese women